Kłoda  is a village in the administrative district of Gmina Rydzyna, within Leszno County, Greater Poland Voivodeship, in west-central Poland.

The village has a population of 1,200.

References

Villages in Leszno County